The  is a self-anchored suspension bridge located in Osaka, Japan. The bridge's unusual design has only a single main cable. At the time of its completion it was the largest self-anchored suspension bridge in the world. Its centre span has been tied by the Yeongjong Grand Bridge in Korea which has slightly larger side spans.

References

External links
 
 A picture of the bridge

Self-anchored suspension bridges
Bridges completed in 1990
1990 establishments in Japan
Suspension bridges in Japan
Bridges in Osaka Prefecture
Konohana-ku, Osaka